Edlin "Buddy" Terry (January 30, 1941 - November 29, 2019) was an American jazz musician and alto/tenor sax player. He was born in Newark, New Jersey. In the 1960s and 1970s Terry made albums for Prestige Records and Mainstream Records. He played with the group Swingadelic from 2000 to 2010. He died on November 29, 2019 at the age of 78 from a stroke.

Discography
Electric Soul! (Prestige, 1967)
Natural Soul (Natural Woman) (Prestige, 1968) 
Awareness (Mainstream, 1971)
Pure Dynamite (Mainstream, 1972)
Lean on Him (Mainstream, 1973)

With others
With Art Blakey and The Jazz Messengers
Child's Dance (Prestige, 1972)
With Billy Hawks
Heavy Soul! (Prestige, 1968)
With Groove Holmes
 I'm in the Mood for Love (Flying Dutchman, 1976) 
With Harold Mabern
A Few Miles from Memphis (Prestige, 1968)
With Joe Morello
Another Step Forward (Ovation, 1969) 
With Alphonse Mouzon
The Essence of Mystery (Blue Note, 1973)
With Freddie Roach
The Freddie Roach Soul Book (Prestige, 1966)
With Swingadelic
Organ-ized!  (MediaMix, 2002)
Big Band Blues (MediaMix, 2005)
Another Monday Night  (MediaMix, 2007)
With The Tonemasters
Goin' With The Flow (Blues Leaf, 2004)

References

1941 births
2019 deaths
Musicians from Newark, New Jersey
Prestige Records artists
Mainstream Records artists